Zampaglione is an Italian surname. Notable people with the surname include:

Domenico Zampaglione (born 1986), Italian footballer
Federico Zampaglione, Italian musician
Fortunato Zampaglione (born 1975), Italian singer-songwriter, producer, lyricist, and composer

Italian-language surnames